Harvest is the fifth studio full-length album by Dragon Ash, released in 2003.

Track listing
All songs written by Dragon Ash.

"Intro" – 0:58
"House of Velocity" – 4:30
"Posse in Noise" – 4:00
"Revive" – 4:34
"United Rhythm ft. 43K, EIG" – 4:16
"Byakuya" – 1:13
"Morrow" – 4:25
"Landscape" – 2:34
"Art of Delta" – 0:56
"Mob Squad (RITMO ACELERADO Remix)" – 4:13
"Episode 4 ft. SHUN, SHIGEO" – 4:59
"Massy Evolution" – 4:25
"Day 6" – 0:27
"Fantasista" – 4:30
"Canvas" – 4:33
"Gymnopedie #1" – 2:45
"Harvest" – 4:25
"Sakurimakori" (2:08) is a hidden track on the record.

Dragon Ash albums
2003 albums
Victor Entertainment albums